The 2001 Asian Beach Volleyball Women's Championship or the 2001 Nestea Asian Beach Volleyball Women's Championship for sponsorship reasons, was a beach volleyball event, that was held from March 30 to April 1, 2001 in Pasay, Philippines. The event serves as the second edition of the Asian Beach Volleyball Championship. The tournament was held at the Cultural Center of the Philippines Complex.

Medal summary

Participating nations 

 (2)
 (2)
 (2)
 (2)
 (3)
 (1)
 (3)
 (2)

Tournament

References

Asian Championships
Beach volleyball
Beach volleyball
Asian Beach Volleyball Championship